Hartmannsdorf (Hartmannsdorf bei Chemnitz) is a small municipality in the district Mittweida, Saxony, Germany, near the town Chemnitz. As of 2020 it has a population of 4,421.

Economy
The Diamant works in Hartmannsdorf are the oldest producing bicycle factory in Germany. Since 2004 it has been the site for the European production of Trek Bicycle Corporation.  Trek took over the Villiger-Diamant production facility which they had purchased in 2003.

Twin towns
 Schönaich, Germany

References

External links
Official website

Mittelsachsen